Baglihar Dam (Hindi: Baglihār Bāndh), also known as Baglihar Hydroelectric Power Project, is a run-of-the-river power project on the Chenab River in the  Ramban district of Jammu and Kashmir, India. The first power project executed by the Jammu and Kashmir Power Development Corporation, it was conceived in 1992 and approved in 1996, with construction begun in 1999. The project was estimated to cost US$1 billion. The project consists of two-stage of 450MW each. The first stage of the project was completed in 2008-09 and was dedicated to the nation by the Prime Minister Manmohan Singh of India. The second stage of the project was completed in 2015–16, and was subsequently dedicated to the nation by the Prime Minister Narendra Modi of India.

Indus Waters dispute 
After construction began in 1999, Pakistan objected that the design parameters of the Baglihar project violated the Indus Water Treaty of 1960. The treaty provides for India to make use of the three western rivers of the Indus River system, including Chenab River, in constrained ways. India can only establish run-of-the-river  power projects with limited reservoir capacity and limited control over flows  needed for feasible power generation. Availing this provision, India planned for several run-of-the-river projects, with Pakistan objecting to them. In the case of the Baglihar and Kishanganga Hydroelectric Plants, Pakistan claimed that some design parameters were too lax. It claimed that they were not needed for feasible power generation but for gaining an excessive ability to accelerate, decelerate or block the flow of the water, thus giving India a strategic leverage in times of political tension or war.

During 1999-2004 India and Pakistan held several rounds of talks on the design of the project, but could not reach an agreement. After the failure of talks on 18 January 2005, Pakistan raised six objections to the World Bank, a broker and signatory of Indus Water Treaty. In April 2005 the World Bank determined the Pakistani claim as a ‘Difference’, a classification that is in-between the less serious ‘Question’ and the more serious ‘Dispute’. In May 2005, it appointed Professor Raymond Lafitte, a Swiss civil engineer as a neutral expert to adjudicate the difference.

Lafitte declared his final verdict on 12 February 2007, in which he upheld some minor objections of Pakistan, requiring that pondage capacity be reduced by 13.5%, the height of dam be reduced by 1.5 meters, and power intake tunnels be raised by 3 meters, thereby limiting some flow control capabilities of the earlier design. However, he rejected Pakistani objections on height and gated control of the spillway, declaring that these featurees conformed to the engineering norms of the day. Pakistan government expressed its disappointment at the outcome. 

The verdict acknowledged India's right to construct 'gated spillways' under Indus Water Treaty. The report allowed pondage of 32.56 million cubic meters against India's demand for 37.5 million cubic metres. The report also recommended reducing the height of freeboard from 4.5 m to 3.0 m. The verdict permitted drawdown flushing to prevent silt accumulation in the reservoir which has enhanced the life of the reservoir to above 80 years. Without drawdown flushing, the reservoir would have been completely silted in 13 years period by 2017.

On 1 June 2010, India and Pakistan had a meeting of the Permanent Indus Commission, where they resolved the issue relating to the initial filling of Baglihar dam. According to PTI, "the two sides discussed the issue at length without any prejudice to each other's stand...Indian and Pakistani teams resolved the issue relating to the initial filling of Baglihar dam after discussions." Pakistan also agreed not to raise the issue further.

See also

Ratle Hydroelectric Plant – under construction upstream
Kishanganga Hydroelectric Plant
Salal Hydroelectric Power Station
Rivers of Jammu and Kashmir

References

Bibliography 
 
 
 }

External links 
 
 Baglihar Dam cleared by neutral expert, Government of India press release, 12 February 2007.
  PM’s opening remarks at the Press Conference, Government of India, 10 October 2008.

Dams in Jammu and Kashmir
Hydroelectric power stations in Jammu and Kashmir
Run-of-the-river power stations
Dams on the Chenab River
Dams completed in 2004
Doda district
Energy infrastructure completed in 2008
Chenab Valley
Tourist attractions in Doda district
2008 establishments in Jammu and Kashmir